The Portland Power was a women's professional basketball team in the American Basketball League (ABL) based in Portland, Oregon. The Power began play in 1996, and disbanded when the ABL folded at the end of 1998. The Power hosted home games at Veterans Memorial Coliseum, which had a capacity of 10,934.

1996-97 season
The Power held their pre-season training camp at Western Oregon University in Monmouth, Oregon. A scrimmage was held in Monmouth on October 6, 1996 against the Seattle Reign. Portland's first head coach was Greg Bruce, who had previously been the head women's basketball coach at Portland State. The Power's first roster included:

Lisa Harrison, forward for Tennessee's 1991 national championship team
Michelle M. Marciniak, guard for Tennessee's 1996 national championship team
Katy Steding, Portland native, 1996 basketball Olympic gold medalist, and forward for Stanford's 1990 national championship team
Coquese Washington, guard for Notre Dame
Natalie Williams, center for UCLA's basketball team and volleyball national championship teams in 1990 and 1991

The Power got off to a poor start, going 5-17 under Bruce. Power players reported to ABL management on at least two occasions that Bruce was difficult to work with. The league met with Bruce, who resigned on January 1, 1997, citing personal reasons. He was replaced by former Purdue coach Lin Dunn. Under Dunn, the Power managed to go 9-9 the rest of the first season, and finished last in the Western Conference. Regional cable television network Prime Sports Northwest broadcast four Power games.

1997-98 season
In their second season, the Power showed much improvement. The team acquired Sylvia Crawley from North Carolina's 1994 national championship team and Delisha Milton from Florida among other players, and won the Western Conference. Coach Dunn was named ABL Coach of the Year, and Williams was named the league's MVP. In the playoffs, the team met the conference runner-up, the Long Beach Stingrays, and lost 2 games to 0.

Season ticket costs ranged from $176 to $265 ($ to $ adjusted for inflation). Individual game tickets cost $11, $13 or $15, depending on the section ($, $, $, respectively, adjusted for inflation).

1998-99 season
For their third season, the Power acquired Steding's former Stanford teammate, point guard Sonja Henning. Though they got off to a slow start, the Power was leading the Western Conference after completing a five-game win streak when the ABL abruptly folded due to financial difficulties on December 22, 1998.

At the time of their demise, the Power's starting lineup was:
Katy Steding, forward
Delisha Milton, forward
Natalie Williams, center
Elaine Powell, guard
Sonja Henning, guard

After the franchise folded, many Power players went on to continue their careers in the WNBA.

Team records

1997-98 playoff results

ABL statistical leaders
1997-98 season:
 Natalie Williams, 1st in ABL in scoring (913 points, 21.7 points per game)
 Natalie Williams, 2nd in ABL in rebounding (477 rebounds, 11.4 rebounds per game)
 Natalie Williams, 1st in ABL in field goal percentage (336 of 604, .556 average)
 Natalie Williams, 4th in ABL in blocks (47 blocks, 1.1 blocks per game)

1998 season (partial):

 Natalie Williams, 2nd in ABL in scoring (258 points, 19.9 points per game)
 Natalie Williams, 2nd in ABL in field goals percentage (94 of 162 .580 average)
 Katy Steding, 1st in ABL in three-point goals (32 of 74 .432 average)
 Natalie Williams, 2nd in ABL in rebounding (129 rebounds, 9.9 rebounds per game)
 Sonja Henning, 2nd in ABL in assists (78 assists, 6.0 per game)

Rosters

All-Star players
Natalie Williams (First Team All-ABL, 1996-97 and 1997-98)

League honors
Natalie Williams, 1997-98 ABL Most Valuable Player
Lin Dunn, 1997-98 ABL Coach of the Year

References

External links
 American Basketball League Tribute site
1996-97 Standings, Awards, and Playoff Results from Infoplease.com
1997-98 Standings, Awards, Playoff Results, and Individual Leaders from Infoplease.com
Portland Power 1999 statistics from CNN/SI.com

American Basketball League (1996–1998) teams
Basketball teams established in 1996
Power
Basketball teams disestablished in 1998
Defunct basketball teams in Oregon
1996 establishments in Oregon
1998 disestablishments in Oregon
Women's sports in Oregon
Basketball in Portland, Oregon